Hillary Alexandra Heron Soto (born 29 January 2004) is a Panamanian artistic gymnast.  She is the 2021 Pan American silver medalist on vault.

Early life
Heron was born in Panama in 2004 to Ricardo Herron and Yaroslavi Soto.

Gymnastics career

Junior

2017–18 
Heron made her international debut at the 2017 South American Junior Championships.  She finished eighth in the all-around, seventh on vault, and eighth on floor exercise.

Heron started the 2018 season competing at the Pacific Rim Championships where she finished sixteenth in the all-around and fourth on vault.  She next competed at the Junior Pan American Championships, where she helped Panama finish seventh as team; Heron finished eleventh in the all-around and fourth on vault.  Additionally she finished seventh floor exercise.  

In October Heron competed at the Junior South American Championships where she placed fourth in the all-around.  During event finals she placed second on vault and balance beam, fourth on uneven bars, and fifth on floor exercise.

2019
Heron was selected to compete at the inaugural Junior World Championships alongside Karla Navas.  Together they finished twenty-third as a team.  Individually Heron finished 44th in the all-around.  Heron ended the season competing at the Junior South American Championships.  She placed fourth in the all-around and helped Panama place third as a team.  During event finals she placed first on vault, third on uneven bars, fourth on balance beam, and eighth on floor exercise.

Senior

2020–21
Heron became age-eligible for senior competition in 2020; however most competitions were canceled or postponed in 2020 due to the global COVID-19 pandemic.  Therefore Heron did not compete that year.  She returned to competition at the 2021 Pan American Championships where she helped Panama place fourth as a team and individually she placed twelfth in the all-around.  During event finals she placed second on vault behind Natalia Escalera.

2022 
Heron competed at the Bolivarian Games where she helped Panama finish third as a team.  Individually she finished third in the all-around and on vault but won silver on floor exercise.  She next competed at the Pan American Championships where she helped Panama finish tenth as a team during qualifications.  Individually she placed twenty-ninth in the all-around.  At the South American Games Heron won silver on vault and bronze on floor exercise.

Competitive history

References

External links
 

2004 births
21st-century Panamanian women
Panamanian female artistic gymnasts
Competitors at the 2022 South American Games
Living people
South American Games silver medalists for Panama
South American Games bronze medalists for Panama
South American Games medalists in gymnastics
Sportspeople from Panama City